Black Peter or Zwarte Piet is a mythical figure.

Black Peter may also refer to:
 Black Peter (film), by Miloš Forman
 Black Peter (card game), a European card game similar to Old Maid.
 a British tag game played by children; see 
 A song by the Grateful Dead on Workingman's Dead
"The Adventure of Black Peter", a 1904 Sherlock Holmes story by Arthur Conan Doyle

See also
Black Pete (disambiguation)